Kevin Widmer (born 23 September 1970) is a retired Swiss athlete who competed in sprinting events. He represented his country at the 1996 Summer Olympics, as well as three outdoor and two indoor World Championships. Widmer is of Vietnamese descent and currently works as an athletics coach.

He still holds Swiss records in the outdoor and indoor 200 metres.

Competition record

Personal bests
Outdoor
100 metres – 10.24 (+1.3 m/s) (La Chaux-de-Fonds 1995)
200 metres – 20.41 (-0.2 m/s) (La Chaux-de-Fonds 1995) NR
400 metres – 45.84 (Lindau 1995)
Indoor
60 metres – 6.65 (Magglingen 1998)
200 metres – 20.99 (Magglingen 1998) NR
400 metres – 46.72 (Magglingen 2006)

References

1970 births
Living people
Swiss male sprinters
Athletes (track and field) at the 1996 Summer Olympics
Swiss people of Vietnamese descent
Olympic athletes of Switzerland